Syncalathium is a genus of Chinese plants in the tribe Cichorieae within the family Asteraceae.

 Species
 Syncalathium chrysocephalum (C.Shih) S.W.Liu - Qinghai, Tibet
 Syncalathium disciforme (Mattf.) Y.Ling - Gansu, Qinghai, Sichuan
 Syncalathium kawaguchii (Kitam.) Y.Ling - Qinghai, Tibet
 Syncalathium porphyreum (C.Marquand & Airy Shaw) Y.Ling - Qinghai, Tibet
 Syncalathium roseum Ling - Tibet

 formerly included
see Parasyncalathium 
 Syncalathium orbiculariforme - Parasyncalathium souliei 
 Syncalathium souliei - Parasyncalathium souliei

References

Cichorieae
Asteraceae genera
Endemic flora of China